Philip Gogulla (born 31 July 1987) is a German professional ice hockey forward who is currently playing with Düsseldorfer EG of the Deutsche Eishockey Liga (DEL).

Playing career
Gogulla began his professional career with the Krefeld Pinguine at the age of 15 in 2002, although his professional league debut in the DEL came first with the Kölner Haie two years later. He has since become a regular player for the team, and also represented the Germany national ice hockey team on several occasions.

Gogulla was drafted in the second round, 48th overall, by the Buffalo Sabres in the 2005 NHL Entry Draft. He signed an entry-level contract with the Buffalo Sabres on 1 June 2007, to prevent him from re-entering the NHL entry draft in 2007, although there was some confusion as to whether he had signed. NHL rules state prospects must be signed before 5:00pm EDT on 1 June or the team's rights to the player expire and he is free to re-enter the draft or become a free agent. Gogulla was signed by this deadline, but the contract had to be approved by the NHL. There was a delay in the approval process meaning the deal could not be announced and so it was assumed that the management had failed to sign Gogulla in time. On 2 June 2007, the deal was approved and announced as a three-year entry-level contract.

In the first two seasons of his deal, Gogulla remained in Köln on loan from the Sabres. On 22 March 2008, he ended the longest German hockey game ever and the second longest worldwide, scoring 8:16 into the sixth overtime period for a 5–4 victory over the Mannheim Eagles.

 In the 2009–10 season, Philip stayed in North America after attending the Buffalo Sabres' 2009 Prospect camp held at Dwyer Arena, home of Niagara University Purple Eagles, from 6–10 July 2009. Upon completing his third NHL training camp he was reassigned to AHL affiliate, the Portland Pirates.

Gogulla spent the entirety of the season with the Pirates and contributed 15 goals and 35 points in 76 games. Gogulla was recalled by the Sabres to their taxi squad for the playoffs following the conclusion of the Pirates post-season. Despite being unable to make his NHL debut, Gogulla was still named to the German extended squad to take part in the Vancouver Winter Olympics.

On 8 June 2010, as a restricted free agent from the Sabres, Gogulla opted to return to Kölner and the DEL and signed a three-year deal to start in the 2010–11 season.

On May 18, 2018, after securing a release from his contract with the Sharks following his 13th season with the club, Gogulla signed with just his second DEL club, in agreeing to a one-year contract with hometown team, Düsseldorfer EG. In the 2018–19 season, Gogulla scored at a point-per-game pace to lead Düsseldorfer with 52 points in 52 games. After a first round seven game defeat to Augsburger Panther, Gogulla opted to leave the club at the conclusion of his contract despite an offer to remain by Düsseldorfer on April 6, 2019.

On April 29, 2019, Gogulla agreed to a one-year contract with perennial contending club, EHC München.

Career statistics

Regular season and playoffs

International

References

External links
 

1987 births
Living people
Buffalo Sabres draft picks
Düsseldorfer EG players
German ice hockey left wingers
Kölner Haie players
EHC München players
Portland Pirates players
Sportspeople from Düsseldorf